Conservula cinisigna is a moth of the family Noctuidae. It is found in Africa south of the Sahara.

References

External links
 *Picture on Flickr

Moths described in 1906
Amphipyrinae
Moths of Sub-Saharan Africa
Moths of Madagascar
Moths of Réunion
Moths of the Comoros
Moths of Mauritius
Lepidoptera of Malawi
Moths of São Tomé and Príncipe